El Prado is a former settlement in Fresno County, California. The primary function of the settlement was as a switch yard and was initially known as "Nopac Siding", which was changed to El Prado (The Meadow) shortly after its construction. It still appeared on maps as of 1922.

References

Former settlements in Fresno County, California
Former populated places in California